Chasnud-e Payan is a village in Badakhshan Province in north-eastern Afghanistan, located at the confluence of the Chashnud Dara and the Panj River.

References

Populated places in Shighnan District